Homi Kharshedji Bhabha (born 1 November 1949) is an Indian-British scholar and critical theorist. He is the Anne F. Rothenberg Professor of the Humanities at Harvard University. He is one of the most important figures in contemporary postcolonial studies, and has developed a number of the field's neologisms and key concepts, such as hybridity, mimicry, difference, and ambivalence. Such terms describe ways in which colonised people have resisted the power of the coloniser, according to Bhabha's theory. In 2012, he received the Padma Bhushan award in the field of literature and education from the Indian government. He is married to attorney and Harvard lecturer Jacqueline Bhabha, and they have three children.

Early life and education
Born in Bombay, India, into a Parsi family, Bhabha graduated with a B.A. from Elphinstone College at the University of Mumbai and an M.A., M.Phil., and D.Phil. in English Literature from Christ Church, Oxford University.

Career
After lecturing in the Department of English at the University of Sussex for more than ten years, Bhabha received a senior fellowship at Princeton University where he was also made Old Dominion Visiting Professor. He was Steinberg Visiting Professor at the University of Pennsylvania where he delivered the Richard Wright Lecture Series. At Dartmouth College, Bhabha was a faculty fellow at the School of Criticism and Theory. From 1997 to 2001 he served as Chester D. Tripp Professor in the Humanities at the University of Chicago. In 2001–02, he served as a distinguished visiting professor at University College, London. He has been the Anne F. Rothenberg Professor of English and American Literature and Language at Harvard University since 2001. Bhabha also serves on the Editorial Collective of Public Culture, an academic journal published by Duke University Press. He served on the Humanities jury for the Infosys Prize for three years. He was awarded the Padma Bhushan award by the Government of India in 2012.

Ideas

Hybridity
One of his central ideas is that of "hybridisation," which, taking up from Edward Said's work, describes the emergence of new cultural forms from multiculturalism. Instead of seeing colonialism as something locked in the past, Bhabha shows how its histories and cultures constantly intrude on the present, demanding that we transform our understanding of cross-cultural relations. His work transformed the study of colonialism by applying post-structuralist methodologies to colonial texts.

Ambivalence
The idea of ambivalence sees culture as consisting of opposing perceptions and dimensions. Bhabha claims that this ambivalence—this duality that presents a split in the identity of the colonized other—allows for beings who are a hybrid of their own cultural identity and the colonizer's cultural identity. Ambivalence contributes to the reason why colonial power is characterized by its belatedness. Colonial signifiers of authority only acquire their meanings after the "traumatic scenario of colonial difference, cultural or racial, returns the eye of power to some prior archaic image or identity. Paradoxically, however, such an image can neither be 'original'—by virtue of the act of repetition that constructs it—nor identical—by virtue of the difference that defines it." Accordingly, the colonial presence remains ambivalent, split between its appearance as original and authoritative and its articulation as repetition and difference. This opens up the two dimensions of colonial discourse: that which is characterized by invention and mastery and that of displacement and fantasy.

Cultural difference, enunciation, and stereotype
Bhabha presents cultural difference as an alternative to cultural diversity. In cultural diversity, a culture is an "object of empirical knowledge" and pre-exists the knower while cultural difference sees culture as the point at which two or more cultures meet and it is also where most problems occur, discursively constructed rather than pre-given, a "process of enunciation of culture as 'knowledgeable.'" Enunciation is the act of utterance or expression of a culture that takes place in the Third Space. Since culture is never pre-given, it must be uttered. It is through enunciation that cultural difference is discovered and recognized. The enunciative process introduces a divide between the traditions of a stable system of reference and the negation of the certitude of culture in the articulation of new cultural, meanings, strategies, in the political present, as a practice of domination, or resistance.

Consequently, cultural difference is a process of identification, while cultural diversity is comparative and categorized. Moreover, it is that possibility of difference and articulation that could free the signifier of skin/culture from the fixations of racial typology, however, the stereotype impedes the circulation and articulation of the signifier of "race" as anything other than that. An important aspect of colonial and post-colonial discourse is their dependence on the concept of "fixity" in the construction of otherness. Fixity implies repetition, rigidity and an unchanging order as well as disorder. The stereotype depends on this notion of fixity. The stereotype creates an "identity" that stems as much from mastery and pleasure as it does from anxiety and defense of the dominant, "for it is a form of multiple and contradictory beliefs in its recognition of difference and disavowal of it."

Mimicry
Like Bhabha's concept of hybridity, mimicry is a metonym of presence. Mimicry appears when members of a colonized society imitate and take on the culture of the colonizers. Jacques Lacan asserts, "The effect of mimicry is camouflage...it is not a question of harmonizing with the background, but against a mottled background." Colonial mimicry comes from the colonist's desire for a reformed, recognizable Other, as a subject of a difference that is, as Bhabha writes, "almost the same, but not quite." Thus, mimicry is a sign of a double articulation; a strategy which appropriates the Other as it visualizes power. Furthermore, mimicry is the sign of the inappropriate, "a difference or recalcitrance which coheres the dominant strategic function of colonial power, intensifies surveillance, and poses an imminent threat to both 'normalized' knowledges and disciplinary powers."

In this way, mimicry gives the colonial subject a partial presence, as if the 'colonial' is dependent for its representation within the authoritative discourse itself. Ironically, the colonists desire to emerge as 'authentic' through mimicry—through a process of writing and repetition—through this partial representation. On the other hand, Bhabha does not interpret mimicry as a narcissistic identification of the colonizer in which the colonized stops being a person without the colonizer present in his identity. He sees mimicry as a "double vision which in disclosing the ambivalence of colonial discourse also disrupts its authority. And it is a double vision that is a result of what [he has] described as the partial representation/recognition of the colonial object...the figures of a doubling, the part-objects of a metonymy of colonial desire which alienates the modality and normality of those dominate discourses in which they emerge as 'inappropriate colonial subjects'."

The colonized's desire is inverted as the colonial appropriation now produces a partial vision of the colonizer's presence; a gaze from the Other is the counterpart to the colonizer's gaze that shares the insight of genealogical gaze which frees the marginalized individual and breaks the unity of man's being through which he had extended his sovereignty. Thus, "the observer becomes the observed and 'partial' representation rearticulates the whole notion of identity and alienates it from essence."

Third Space
The Third Space acts as an ambiguous area that develops when two or more individuals/cultures interact (compare this to urbanist Edward W. Soja's conceptualization of thirdspace). It "challenges our sense of the historical identity of culture as a homogenizing, unifying force, authenticated by the originary past, kept alive in the national tradition of the People." This ambivalent area of discourse, which serves as a site for the discursive conditions of enunciation, "displaces the narrative of the Western written in homogeneous, serial time." It does so through the "disruptive temporality of enunciation." Bhabha claims that "cultural statements and systems are constructed in this contradictory and ambivalent space of enunciation." As a result, the hierarchical claims to the innate originality or purity of cultures are invalid. Enunciation implies that culture has no fixity and even the same signs can be appropriated, translated, rehistoricized, and read anew.

Influences
Bhabha's work in postcolonial theory owes much to post-structuralism. Notable among Bhabha's influences include Jacques Derrida and deconstruction; Jacques Lacan and Lacanian psychoanalysis; and Michel Foucault's notion of discursivity. Additionally, in a 1995 interview with W. J. T. Mitchell, Bhabha stated that Edward Said is the writer who has most influenced him. In the social sciences, Edward W. Soja has most thoroughly relied on and transformed Bhabha's approaches to understanding notion of space, action, and representation.

Reception
Bhabha has been criticized for using indecipherable jargon and dense prose. In 1998, the journal Philosophy and Literature awarded Bhabha second prize in its "Bad Writing Competition," which "celebrates bad writing from the most stylistically lamentable passages found in scholarly books and articles." Bhabha was awarded the prize for a sentence in  The Location of Culture (Routledge, 1994):

If, for a while, the ruse of desire is calculable for the uses of discipline soon the repetition of guilt, justification, pseudo-scientific theories, superstition, spurious authorities, and classifications can be seen as the desperate effort to "normalize" formally the disturbance of a discourse of splitting that violates the rational, enlightened claims of its enunciatory modality.

Professor Emeritus of English at Stanford University Marjorie Perloff said that her reaction to Bhabha's appointment to the Harvard faculty was one of "dismay," telling the New York Times that "He doesn't have anything to say." Mark Crispin Miller, a professor of media studies at New York University, remarked on Bhabha's writing: "One could finally argue that there is no meaning there, beyond the neologisms and Latinate buzzwords. Most of the time I don't know what he's talking about."

In a 2005 interview, Bhabha expressed his annoyance at such criticisms and the implied expectation that philosophers should use the "common language of the common person," while scientists are given a pass for the similar use of language that is not immediately comprehensible to casual readers. In his review entitled "Goodbye to the Enlightenment," Terry Eagleton provided a more substantive critique of Bhabha's work, explaining in The Guardian (8 February 1994) that "Bhabha's aim is to put the skids under every cherished doctrine of Western Enlightenment, from the idea of progress to the unity of the self, from the classical work of art to the notions of law and civility." Bhabha uses India, for instance, as an example of alternative possibilities when he argues that the very idea and practice of secularism is changing.

In February 2022, Bhabha was one of 38 Harvard faculty to sign a letter to the Harvard Crimson defending Professor John Comaroff, who had been found to have violated the university's sexual and professional conduct policies. The letter defended Comaroff as "an excellent colleague, advisor and committed university citizen" and expressed dismay over his being sanctioned by the university. After students filed a lawsuit with detailed allegations of Comaroff's actions and the university's failure to respond, Bhabha was one of several signatories to say that he wished to retract his signature.

Personal life
He is married to attorney and Harvard lecturer Jacqueline Bhabha. The couple have three children together named Leah Bhabha, Ishan Bhabha, and Satya Bhabha. Bhabha is famous for hosting dinner parties. He also prefers to cook meat with bones. As he told one reporter, "It's the bones that make a dish. I always use the bone, never without."

Works

Books 

Includes book edited 

 Nation and Narration, Routledge (1990)
 "A Good Judge of Character: Men, Metaphors, and the Common Culture" in Race-ing Justice, En-gendering Power: Essays on Anita Hill, Clarence Thomas, and the Construction of Social Reality, ed. Toni Morrison, Pantheon Books (1992).
 "In a Spirit of Calm Violence," in After Colonialism: Imperial Histories and Postcolonial Displacements, ed. Gyan Prakash, Princeton University Press (1994).
 The Location of Culture, Routledge (1994)
 Negotiating Rapture: The Power of Art to Transform Lives, Museum of Contemporary Art (1996) 
 Forward to Modernity, Culture, and The Jew, eds. Laura Marcus and Bryan Cheyette, Wiley (1998).
 "Conversational Art" in Conversations at the Castle: Changing Audiences and Contemporary Art, eds. Mary Jane Jacob and Michael Brenson, The MIT Press (1998).
 "Cosmopolitanisms" in Cosmopolitanism, co-ed. with Sheldon I. Pollock, Carol Breckenridge, Arjun Appadurai, and Dipesh Chakrabarty, (originally an issue of Public Culture), Duke University Press (2002).
 "On Cultural Choice," 2000.
 "V.S. Naipaul," 2001
 "Democracy De-Realized," 2002.
 "On Writing Rights," 2003.
 "Making Difference: The Legacy of the Culture Wars," Artforum 2003 (4).
 "Adagio," 2004.
 "Still Life," 2004.
 Foreword to The Wretched of the Earth by Frantz Fanon, transl. Richard Philcox, 2004.
 Edward Said Continuing the Conversation, co-ed. with W. J. T. Mitchell (originally an issue of Critical Inquiry), University of Chicago Press (2004).
 "Framing Fanon," 2005.
 Without Boundary: Seventeen Ways of Looking, with Fereshteh Daftari and Orhan Pamuk, The Museum of Modern Art (2006).
 "The Black Savant and the Dark Princess," 2006.
 Our Neighbours, Ourselves: Contemporary Reflections on Survival, Walter de Gruyter (2011) 
 Anish Kapoor, Flammarion (2011)
 Midnight to the Boom: Painting in India After Independence, Peabody Essex Museum (2013)
 Matthew Barney: River of Fundament, Okwui Enwezor, Hilton Als, Diedrich Diederichsen, David Walsh, Skira (2014)

Articles 

 Bhabha, Homi K. "Apologies for Poetry: A Study in the Method of Mill and Richards." Journal of the School of Languages [New Delhi] 3.1 (1975): 71–88.
 Bhabha, Homi K. "Parthasarathy, R. "Indo-Anglican attitudes." TLS, Times literary supplement 3 (1978): 136.
 Bhabha, Homi K. "The Other Question…." Screen (November—December 1983), 24(6), 18–36. 
 Bhabha, Homi K. "Representation and the colonial text: a critical exploration of some forms of mimeticism." The Theory of reading. Ed. Frank Gloversmith. Brighton, Sussex: Harvester Press, 1984.
 Bhabha, Homi K. "Remembering Fanon. Introduction to the English edition of Black skin white mask." Black skin white mask. London: Pluto Press, 1986.
 Bhabha, Homi K. "'What does the Black man want?'." New Formations 1 (1987): 118–130.
 Bhabha, Homi K. "Remembering Fanon: self, psyche, and the colonial condition." Remaking history. Ed. Barbara Kruger and Phil Mariani. Seattle: Bay Press, 1989.
 Bhabha, Homi K. "Hybridité, identité et culture contemporaine." Magiciens de la terre. Ed. Jean Hubert Martin. Paris: Editions du Centre Pompidou, 1989.
 Bhabha, Homi K. "At the limits." Artforum 27.9 (1989): 11–12.
 Bhabha, Homi K. "Imaginings." New statesman & society 2.70 (1989): 45–47.
 Bhabha, Homi K. "Articulating the archaic: notes on colonial nonsense." Literary theory today. Ed. Peter Collier and Helga Geyer-Ryan. Ithaca, N.Y.: Cornell University Press, 1990.
 Bhabha, Homi K. "The other question: difference, discrimination and the discourse of colonialism." Out there: marginalization and contemporary cultures. Ed. Russell. New York: New Museum of Contemporary Art, 1990.
 Bhabha, Homi K. "Interrogating identity: the postcolonial prerogative." Anatomy of racism. Ed. David Theo Goldberg. Minneapolis: University of Minnesota Press, 1990.
 Bhabha, Homi K. "DissemiNation: time, narrative, and the margins of the modern nation." Nation and narration. Ed. Homi K. Bhabha. London; New York: Routledge, 1990.
 Bhabha, Homi K. "Novel metropolis." New statesman society 3.88 (1990): 16.
 Bhabha, Homi K. "A question of survival: nations and psychic states." Psychoanalysis and cultural theory: thresholds. Ed. James Donald. New York: St. Martin's Press, 1991.
 Bhabha, Homi K. "Art and National Identity: A Critics' Symposium." Art in America 79.9 (1991): 80-.
 Bhabha, Homi K. "'Race', time and the revision of modernity." The Oxford Literary Review 13.1-2 (1991): 193–219.
 Bhabha, Homi K. "Postcolonial criticism." Redrawing the boundaries: the transformation of English and American literary studies. Ed. Stephen Greenblatt and Giles B. Gunn. New York: Modern Language Association of America, 1992.
 Bhabha, Homi K. "Of mimicry and man: the ambivalence of colonial discourse." Modern literary theory: a reader. Ed. Philip; Waugh Rice, Patricia. 2nd ed. ed. London; New York: E. Arnold, 1992.
 Bhabha, Homi K. "A good judge of character: men, metaphors, and the common culture." Race-ing justice, en-gendering power: Essays on Anita Hill, Clarence Thomas, and the construction of social reality. Ed. Toni Morrison. New York: Pantheon Books, 1992.
 Bhabha, Homi K. "Postcolonial authority and postmodern guilt." Cultural Studies. Ed. Lawrence Grossberg, Cary Nelson, and Paula A. Treichler. New York: Routledge, 1992.
 Bhabha, Homi K. "Double visions." Artforum 30.5 (1992): 85–59.
 Bhabha, Homi K. "Freedom's basis in the indeterminate." October 61 (1992): 46–57.
 Bhabha, Homi K. "The world and the home." Social text 10.2-3 (1992): 141–153.
 Bhabha, Homi K. "Beyond the pale: art in the age of multicultural translation." Cultural diversity in the arts: art, art policies and the facelift of Europe. Ed. Ria Lavrijsen. Amsterdam: Royal Tropical Institute, 1993.
 Bhabha, Homi K. "Culture's in between." Artforum 32.1 (1993): 167–170.
 Bhabha, Homi K. "The commitment to theory." Questions of third cinema. Ed. Jim Pines and Paul Willemen. London: BFI Pub., 1994.
 Bhabha, Homi K. "Frontlines / borderposts." Displacements: cultural identities in question. Ed. Angelika Bammer. Bloomington: Indiana University Press: Indiana University Press, 1994.
 Bhabha, Homi K. "Remembering Fanon: self, psyche and the colonial condition." Colonial discourse and post-colonial theory: a reader. Ed. R. J. Patrick Williams and Laura Chrisman. New York: Columbia University Press, 1994.
 Bhabha, Homi K. "The enchantment of art." The artist in society: rights, roles, and responsibilities. Ed. Kathy Becker, Carol Acker, and Ann Wiens. Chicago: Chicago New Art Association, New Art Examiner Press, 1995.
 Bhabha, Homi K. "Are you a man or a mouse?" Constructing masculinity. Ed. Maurice Berger, Brian Wallis, Simon Watson, and Carrie Weems. New York: Routledge, 1995.
 Bhabha, Homi K. "Homi Bhabha on the New Black Intellectual." Artforum international 34.2 (1995): 16–17.
 Bhabha, Homi K. "Dance this diss around." Artforum 33.8 (1995): 19–20.
 Bhabha, Homi K. "[Dialogues with Homi Bhabha, et al.]." The fact of blackness: Frantz Fanon and visual representation. Ed. Alan Read. Seattle: Bay Press, 1996.
 Bhabha, Homi K. "Postmodernism/postcolonialism." Critical terms for art history. Ed. Robert S. Nelson and Richard Shiff. Chicago: University of Chicago Press, 1996.
 Bhabha, Homi K. "Unpacking my library ... again." The post-colonial question: common skies, divided horizons. Ed. Iain Chambers and Lidia Curti. London; New York: Routledge, 1996.
 Bhabha, Homi K. "Day by day . . . with Frantz Fanon." The fact of blackness. Ed. Alan Read. Seattle: Bay Press, 1996.
 Bhabha, Homi K. "Laughing stock." Artforum 35.2 (1996): 15–17.
 Bhabha, Homi K. "Unsatisfied: notes on vernacular cosmopolitanism." Text and Nation: Cross-Disciplinary Essays on Cultural and National Identities. Ed. Laura Garcia-Moreno and Peter C. Pfeiffer. Columbia, SC: Camden House, 1996. 191–207.
 Bhabha, Homi K. "World and the home." Dangerous liaisons: gender, nation, and postcolonial perspectives. Ed. Anne McClintock, Aamir Mufti, and Ella Shohat. Minneapolis: University of Minnesota Press, 1997.
 Bhabha, Homi K. "Postscript: bombs away in front-line suburbia." Visions of suburbia. Ed. Roger Silverstone. London; New York: Routledge, 1997.
 Bhabha, Homi K. "Designer creations." Artforum 36.4 (1997): 11–14.
 Bhabha, Homi K. "[Reviews of: Colonialism and its Forms of Knowledge: The British in India; and Subaltern Studies, vol. 9, Writings on South Asian History and Society]." TLS. Times Literary Supplement. 4923 (1997): 14–15.
 Bhabha, Homi K. "Halfway house." Artforum 35.9 (1997): 11–13.
 Bhabha, Homi K. "Queen's English." Artforum 35.7 (1997): 25–27.
 Bhabha, Homi K. "Front lines / border posts." Critical inquiry 23.3 (1997).
 Bhabha, Homi K. "Dance this diss around." The crisis of criticism. Ed. Maurice Berger. New York: New Press, 1998.
 Bhabha, Homi K. "The white stuff." Artforum 36.9 (1998): 21–23.
 Bhabha, Homi K. "On the irremovable strangeness of being different [one of "Four views of ethnicity"]." PMLA 113.1 (1998): 34-39.
 Bhabha, Homi K. "Liberalism's sacred cow." Is multiculturalism bad for women? Ed. Susan Moller Okin and Joshua Cohen. Princeton, N.J: Princeton University Press, 1999.
 Bhabha, Homi K. (interviewer). "Alter/Native Modernities - Miniaturizing Modernity: Shahzia Sikander in Conversation with Homi K Bhabha." Public culture: bulletin of the Project for Transnational Cultural Studies 11.1 (1999): 146–152.
 Bhabha, Homi K. "Afterword: an ironic act of courage." Milton and the imperial vision. Ed. Rajan Balachandra and Elizabeth Sauer. Pittsburgh, Pa: Duquesne University Press, 1999.
 Bhabha, Homi K.; Dudiker, Karsten (trans.). "'Angst' in kultureller Ubersetzung." Heterotopien der Identitat: Literatur in interamerikanischen Kontaktzonen. Ed. Hermann Herlinghaus; Utz Riese. Heidelberg, Germany: Carl Winter Universitatsverlag, 1999. 83–97.

Interviews 

 Koundoura, Maria; Rai, Amit. "Interview: Homi Bhabha." Stanford humanities review 3.1 (1993): 1–6.
 Bennett, David, and Collits, Terry. "Postcolonial critic: Homi Bhabha interviewed by David Bennett and Terry Collits." Literary India: comparative studies in aesthetics, colonialism, and culture. Ed. Patrick Colm Hogan; Lalita Pandit. SUNY series in Hindu studies. Albany: State Univ. of New York, 1995.
 Mitchell, W.J.T. "Translator translated (interview with cultural theorist Homi Bhabha)." Artforum 33.7 (1995): 80–84.
 Hall, Gary; Wortham, Simon. "Rethinking Authority: Interview with Homi K. Bhabha." Angelaki 2.2 (1996): 59–63.

General criticism 

 Thompson, Paul. “Between identities: Homi Bhabha interviewed by Paul Thompson.” Migration and identity. Ed. Rina Benmayor, Andor Skotnes. Oxford; New York: Oxford University Press, 1984.
 Xie, Shaobo. “Writing on boundaries: Homi Bhabha's recent essays.” ARIEL: A review of International English literature 27.4 (1996): 155–166.
 Leonard, Philip. "Degenerescent Lections: Legal Fictions in Rushdie, Derrida, and Bhabha." New Formations: A Journal of Culture, Theory & Politics 32 (1997): 109–119.
 Easthope, Anthony. "Bhabha, hybridity, and identity." Textual practice 12.2 (1998): 341–348.
 Fludernik, Monika. "The constitution of hybridity: postcolonial interventions." Hybridity and postcolonialism: twentieth-century Indian literature. Ed. Monika Fludernik. Tübingen, Germany: Stauffenburg, 1998. 19–53.
 Phillips, Lawrence. "Lost in Space: Siting/Citing the In-Between of Homi Bhabha's The Location of Culture." Jouvert: A Journal of Postcolonial Studies 2.2 (1998).
 Perloff, Marjorie. "Cultural liminality / Aesthetic closure?: The interstitial perspective of Homi Bhabha."
 Ray, Sangeeta. “The nation in performance: Bhabha, Mukherjee and Kureishi.” Hybridity and postcolonialism: twentieth-century Indian literature. Ed. Monika Fludernik. Tübingen, Germany: Stauffenburg, 1998. 219–238.

See also
 List of deconstructionists
 Post-colonialism
 Post-structuralism
 Postmodernism
 Racial fetishism

References

External links

 Faculty webpage at Harvard University
 Gewertz, Ken. "Telling tales out of, and in, class" at Harvard University Gazette, 31 January 2002
 Culture Machine article on Bhabha

Interviews
 Interview with Kerry Chance (pdf)
 "Rethinking experience of countries with colonial past," Interview with Jeff Makos. The University of Chicago Chronicle, 16 February 1995, Vol. 14, No. 12
 W. J. T. Mitchell, "Translator translated" (interview with cultural theorist Homi Bhabha). Artforum v.33, n.7 (March 1995):80-84.
 "Towards a global cultural citizenship." Interview with Sachidananda Mohanty. The Hindu, 3 July 2005.
 "The Third Space." Interview with Jonathan Rutherford, 1990 (pdf)
 "Diaspora and Home: An Interview with Homi K. Bhabha." Interview with Klaus Stierstorfer. De Gruyter Conversations, 7 December 2017

Videos
 , Narrating Heritage conference, Austria, 12 July 2006;
 , lecture given at Columbia University, April 29, 2013

1949 births
20th-century Indian philosophers
Academics of the University of Sussex
American male writers of Indian descent
Harvard University faculty
Indian emigrants to the United States
Living people
Postcolonial theorists
Recipients of the Padma Bhushan in literature & education
Alumni of Christ Church, Oxford
Poststructuralists
Postmodernists
Critical theorists
Writers from Mumbai
American academics of Indian descent
Parsi people
Parsi people from Mumbai